Xuē Xīnrán (pen name Xinran, born in Beijing in 1958) is a British-Chinese journalist, author, speaker, and advocate for women's issues.
She was a popular radio personality in China with a call-in program named "Words on the Night Breeze" from 1989 to 1997. The program focused on women's issues and life stories. She was well known for travelling extensively in China to interview women for her work. In 1997, she moved to London and began writing stories of the women she met along her journeys. Her first book, The Good Women of China, was published in 2002, becoming an international bestseller. She frequently contributes to The Guardian and the BBC.

Education
First Military University of People's Liberation Army, 1983–1987; English and International Relations

Personal life
Xinran was born into a wealthy and privileged family on 19 July 1958. She was raised by her grandparents due to her parents' imprisonment during China's cultural revolution. She has said that her first memory was of the Red Guards setting her home on fire when she was 6 years old.

Xinran was married, while working as an army administrator, and has one son, Panpan, who was born in 1988. She later divorced. She moved to London in 1997 and married British literary agent Toby Eady (son of Mary Wesley) in 2002.

Books
In London, she began work on her seminal book about Chinese women's lives The Good Women of China, a memoir relating many of the stories she heard while hosting her radio show ("Words on the Night Breeze") in China.  The book is a candid revelation of many Chinese women's thoughts and experiences that took place both during and after the Cultural Revolution when Chairman Mao ruled the land. The book was published in 2002 and has been translated into over thirty languages.

Sky Burial, her second book, was published in 2004.  This is the story of Shu Wen, whose husband, only a few months after their marriage in the 1950s, joined the Chinese army and was sent to Tibet for the purpose of unification of the two cultures.

A collection of Xinran’s Guardian columns from 2003 to 2005, What the Chinese Don't Eat, was published in 2006. It covers a vast range of topics from food to sex education, and from the experiences of British mothers who have adopted Chinese daughters, to whether Chinese people do Christmas shopping or have swimming pools.

Xinran‘s first novel Miss Chopsticks was published in July 2007. It explores the uneasy relationship between Chinese "migrant workers" and the cities they flock to. China's economic reform is changing the role of its chopstick girls. Once a disposable burden, they can now take city jobs as waitresses, masseuses, factory line workers and cleaners, They bring bundles of cash home, earning them unprecedented respect in patriarchal villages, as well as winning the respect and hearts of city dwellers.

Xinran’s fifth book, China Witness: Voices from a Silent Generation was published in the UK in October 2008. It is based on twenty years worth of interviews conducted by Xinran with the last two generations in China. She hopes it will, ‘restore a real modern history of China, from real people after most historical evidence was destroyed in the Culture Revolution’ .  She followed this in February 2010, with the publication of  Message from an Unknown Chinese Mother, a collection of heartbreaking stories from Chinese mothers who have lost or had to abandon children. In 2015 she published Buy Me the Sky, which contains stories of the children brought up under China's One-child policy and the effect that has had on their lives, families and ability to deal with life's challenges.

Her most recent book,'The Promise: Tales of Love and Loss in Modern China, was published by I.B.Tauris/Bloomsbury in 2019. Kirkus Reviews called it a 'graceful work that restores a lost generation to history' and Robert O'Brien in the Tablet said, 'As our curiosity about the Chinese grows, she will surely become essential reading'.

Other
In August 2004 Xinran set up ‘The Mothers’ Bridge of Love’ (MBL). MBL reaches out to Chinese children in all corners of the world; by creating a bridge of understanding between China and the West and between adoptive culture and birth culture, MBL ultimately wants to help bridge the huge poverty gap which still exists in many parts of China.
The MBL book for adoptive families, Mother's Bridge of Love, came third in TIME magazine’s list of the top ten children’s books of 2007.

Xinran often advises western media (including BBC and Sky) about western relations with China, and makes frequent television and radio appearances. She is a member of the Advisory Board of the Asia House Festival of Asian Literature.

Bibliography
 The Good Women of China: Hidden Voices. Vintage, 2003, .
 Sky Burial. Chatto & Windus, 2004.  (hardback) /  (paperback).
 What the Chinese Don't Eat. Vintage, 2006. .
 Miss Chopsticks. Vintage, 2008. .
 China Witness: Voices from a Silent Generation. Chatto & Windus, 2008. .
 Message from an Unknown Chinese Mother. Chatto & Windus, 2010. .
 Buy Me the Sky, The Remarkable Truth of China's One-Child Generations Rider, 2015, .
The Promise: Love and Loss in Modern China, I.B. Tauris, 2018,

References

External links
Maja Linnemann & Zheng Hong: 历史需要诚实和公平 ——专访薛欣然 / Xue Xinran: "Geschichte braucht Ehrlichkeit und Fairness" (Interview with Xinran, February 2009, available in Chinese and German). Accessed 2009-05-18.
Xinran's English Blog. Accessed 2009-05-18.
Random House (UK publisher): The Good Women of China by Xinran. Accessed 2009-05-18.
Oliver August: China Witness by Xinran (Book review). The Times, September 26, 2008. Accessed 2015-09-04.
Katy Guest: China Witness, By Xinran, trans. Julia Lovell, Esther Tyldesley & Nicky Harman (review). The Independent, Friday, 24 October 2008. Accessed 2009-05-18.

1958 births
Living people
Writers from Beijing
British journalists
The Guardian journalists
Chinese journalists
British writers of Chinese descent
British women writers
Chinese women writers
Chinese emigrants to England